Xu Yue (born 10 November 1999) is a Chinese professional footballer currently playing as a midfielder for Chinese Super League club Shenzhen F.C.

Club career
Xu joined Shanghai Shenhua's youth academy in March 2018 after the club bought Genbao Football Base's under-19 players.  He was loaned to China League One club Shanghai Shenxin for the 2019 season, making 27 league appearances and was named as the best young player for the 2019 China League One season. On 16 July 2020, Xu was amongst 14 players who joined Chinese Super League club Shenzhen F.C. He was loaned to China League One clubs Jiangxi Beidamen and Wuhan Three Towns for the 2020 and 2021 season respectively, and won the division and achieved promotion with the latter. He retained his position in Shenzhen's first team for the 2022 season, making his Chinese Super league debut on 17 June 2022 in a 1-0 win over Cangzhou Mighty Lions and scoring his first CSL goal in a 3-2 defeat against Tianjin Jinmen Tiger.

International
On 20 July 2022, Xu made his international debut in a 3-0 defeat against South Korea in the 2022 EAFF E-1 Football Championship, as the Chinese FA decided to field the U-23 national team for this senior competition.

Career statistics

Club
.

Notes

Honours

Club
Wuhan Three Towns
China League One: 2021

References

1999 births
Living people
Chinese footballers
China youth international footballers
Association football midfielders
China League One players
Shanghai Shenhua F.C. players
Shanghai Shenxin F.C. players
Shenzhen F.C. players
Jiangxi Beidamen F.C. players